The Indian Journal of Theology was a biannual peer-reviewed academic journal of Christian theology. It was established in 1952 and the last issue appeared in 2004. It was published by Bishop's College, Calcutta) and the theology department at Serampore College. The editors-in-chief were V.C. Samuel (1960-1963), Pratap Chandra Gine, and V. J. John.

Abstracting and indexing
The journal was abstracted and indexed in the ATLA Religion Database.

References

External links 

English-language journals
Christianity studies journals
Publications established in 1952
Publications disestablished in 2004
Biannual journals